Bubble Bobble 2 may refer to:
Rainbow Islands: The Story of Bubble Bobble 2, the first "sequel" to Bubble Bobble
Bubble Bobble Part 2, released on the Nintendo Entertainment System and Game Boy
Bubble Symphony, also known as Bubble Bobble II in some countries